Heather Jean Chasen (20 July 1927 – 22 May 2020) was an English actress, known for her roles in soap operas; playing Valerie Pollard in the ITV soap opera, Crossroads, from 1982 to 1986 and guest roles in Doctors, Holby City and Family Affairs. Chasen also played many roles in BBC Radio 2's The Navy Lark from 1959 to 1977, and appeared in the television series Marked Personal from 1973 to 1974. She played the recurring role of Lydia Simmonds in the BBC soap opera EastEnders, a role which received positive reviews from critics and EastEnders crew and cast members. Furthermore, she appeared extensively in theatre productions and film; in 2012, she appeared in a film version of Les Misérables.

Early and personal life
Chasen was born on 20 July 1927, in Singapore to Agnes H. (née McCullock) and F.N. Chasen, an English ornithologist. Her father fought as a trooper with the Norfolk Yeomanry in World War I. In 1921, he left England to work at the Raffles Library and Museum in Singapore, marrying Chasen's mother, Agnes, in 1926. Chasen's sister, Christine Elizabeth, was born on 4 May 1931. Her parents split up in 1938, and both later remarried.

Before the Japanese occupation, which led to the Battle of Singapore during World War II, Chasen and her mother left Singapore on the last boat before the occupation. Her father, however, on a separate ship, HMS Giang Bee, died when it was sunk by the Japanese on 12 February 1942. Chasen's stepfather, G.C.R. Franks, also died in fighting, on 22 March. Chasen and her mother moved to the UK and she trained at the Royal Academy of Dramatic Art, where she acted on stage and went on tour with Frankie Howerd in Hotel Paradiso. She appeared with Sybil Thorndike in Call Me Jacky, and toured with Douglas Fairbanks Jr. in The Pleasure of his Company, in Toronto. Chasen was friends with, and previously had a relationship with, Amanda Barrie. In Call Me Jacky, she played an alcoholic lesbian, and later claimed to have based her characterisation partly on the novelist and playwright Patricia Highsmith, whom she knew well.

In 1949, Chasen married John Webster, and they had one son, Rupert, who played in Lindsay Anderson's if.... He also appears with Chasen in a 2013 short documentary, A Stage of Development.

Chasen died on 22 May 2020, aged 92.

Career

Crossroads and EastEnders

In 2011, Chasen was cast as Lydia Simmonds, Janine Butcher (Charlie Brooks)'s maternal grandmother and Norman Simmonds' (George Layton) mother, in the BBC soap opera EastEnders, after the original actress Margaret Tyzack had to pull out of the role due to personal reasons. Two episodes featuring Tyzack had already been broadcast, and she featured in a further one on 14 April. Chasen was cast and replaced Tyzack in the role, beginning filming on 15 April  for scenes broadcast from 21 April. EastEnders executive producer, Bryan Kirkwood, added: "In order to continue the current storyline we've taken the decision for Heather Chasen to take over the role of Lydia." The character died on-screen and Chasen made her last appearance on 13 June 2011, and, though not credited for it, did a voice-over for the 14 and 28 June episodes. Kirkwood later said "Lydia's storyline was perfect" and that Chasen had made the part her own after Tyzack's departure. Brooks said of the storyline as a whole, "I absolutely loved exploring Janine's background. I was really proud with the scenes with Heather Chasen [Lydia]. It was really hard work, but worth it."

Other work
Chasen appeared in other television programmes such as The Bill and The Harry Hill Show. She had guest roles in Z-Cars and Dixon of Dock Green and voiced a number of characters in the radio show The Navy Lark, particularly WREN Heather Chasen and "battle axe" Ramona Povey. In soaps, she had four separate appearances in the BBC soap opera Doctors, with her most recent in 2014, reprising her role as Grace Barberry from 2012. She played Sylvie Leigh in Holby City and, for five episodes, Madge Bennet in the Channel 5 soap opera, Family Affairs. Earlier credits include, playing "rich bitches" Caroline Kerr, in The Newcomers and Isabel Neal in Marked Personal, alongside Stephanie Beacham. She also played the "evil" headmistress in Schoolgirls in Uniform at the Battersea Arts Centre. In stage and theatre, Chasen appeared in The Rat Trap. Michael Billington from The Guardian described Chasen's character, Burrage the maid, as "trundling", rating the play three stars. Other than this, she appeared in Pardon Ma Prime Minister alongside Gerald Flood and Paul Curran, written by Edward Taylor and John Graham who created the BBC radio series The Men from the Ministry. The Birmingham Mail described the play as "hilarious" and "promising". One of Chasen's last plays was My Three Angels in which she played Madame Parole, other plays included, The Man Who Came to Dinner, Who Bombed Birmingham playing Margaret Thatcher, and The Lizard of Rock, in which she played the main role, appearing alongside actor Jack Hawkins. Chasen opined that she had a "lovely time" playing Miss Marple in A Murder is Announced alongside Richard Todd and Barbara Murray. In 2009, Chasen appeared in the award-winning Anglo-Russian feature film Season of Mists, playing Jane. Chasen appeared alongside Marina Blake, Sergei Chonishvili, Ifan Huw Dafydd and ex-EastEnders actor Dudley Sutton. Other films she has appeared in include, The Kiss of Tosca in 2000, The Toybox in 2003 and Cat Run, a 2011 film.

Awards and nominations
Chasen was nominated for the Tony Award for Best Performance by a Featured Actress in a Musical, while she appeared in the New York adaptation of A Severed Head between 1963–1965. She appeared in the cast of the Seasons of Mists which won a number of awards internationally.

Filmography
Film

Television

Radio

Stage/Theatre

References

External links

1927 births
2020 deaths
English television actresses
English stage actresses
English soap opera actresses
People from Singapore
English voice actresses
Actresses from London
Alumni of RADA